State Route 508 (SR 508) is a  long state highway located in Lewis County within the U.S. state of Washington, extending from an interchange with  (I-5) concurrent with  (US 12) in Napavine to  in Morton. SSH 5K became SR 508 in 1968 and since then, a segment in Bear Canyon has been reconstructed twice between 2007 and 2009 and a bridge over the Tilton River was reconstructed in 2009.

Route description

From the interchange, the highway leaves Napavine and travels southeast through an intersection with the Jackson Highway, formerly , to bridge and parallel the South Fork of the Newaukum River, passing Onalaska and Alpha before unparalleling the river and continuing east to Cinebar. An estimated daily average of 5,000 motorists used the I-5 / US 12 / SR 508 interchange in 2007, making it the busiest section of the highway; the SR 7 intersection was the busiest section in 1970, with an estimated daily average of 3,200 motorists.

History

A road paralleling the current route of SR 508 first appeared on a map in 1916, extending from Napavine to Cinebar. In 1964, a highway renumbering created SR 508 to replace SSH 5K. In early November 2006, heavy rainfall at Bear Canyon, located east of Cinebar, resulted in erosion of a cliff on the highway that caused portions of the roadway to fall into the Tilton River. Construction of the repairs began April 23, 2007 and a limited opening happened on June 25. On July 27, the new road was opened, but during heavy snowfall between December 19 and 22, 2008 and the resulting floods in early January 2009, the area was washed out. On January 29, 2009, SR 508 was reopened through Bear Canyon. A bridge over the Tilton River west of Milton that was built in 1947 and three other bridges on the highway were classified as structurally deficient in 2008 and the Tilton River Bridge was partially closed in April 2009. The bridge, like Bear Canyon, was damaged during floods in January 2009 and reopened on June 11.

Major intersections

References

External links

Highways of Washington State
Completed WSDOT Projects

508
Transportation in Lewis County, Washington